Irina Ivanovna Fetisova (later Irina Pimenova; born 30 October 1956) is a retired Soviet swimmer and rower.

Swimming
Fetisova was swimming for SKA Leningrad (the Soviet Army Club) and was a member of the Soviet national team from 1970 to 1976. In 1974, she won a national title in the 100 m breaststroke event. At the 1974 European Aquatics Championships, she won a bronze medal in the individual 200 m medley setting a new national record. She finished her swimming career in 1976 and switched to rowing.

Rowing
In 1977, she became a member of the Soviet national rowing team. She went to the 1977 World Rowing Championships in Amsterdam and came fifth with the coxed quad scull team. She dropped out of the national rowing team after her initial year and became a member again from 1981 to 1984, when she competed in single scull. At the 1981 World Rowing Championships in Munich, she won a bronze medal in her new boat class. She became women's single scull world champion at the 1982 World Rowing Championships in Lucerne, Switzerland. At the 1983 World Rowing Championships in Duisburg, Germany, she won a silver medal. In 1984, she changed to coxed quad scull, displaced by Mariya Danyliuk in the single sculls. 
She did not go to the 1984 Summer Olympics due to the boycott led by the Soviet Union. Instead, she competed at the Friendship Games, also dubbed the "alternative Olympics", and won first place with the coxed quad sculls. She finished her rowing career in that year.

Fetisova was awarded the Order of the Badge of Honour for her success in rowing.

References 

1956 births
Living people
Russian female breaststroke swimmers
Russian female medley swimmers
Soviet female breaststroke swimmers
Soviet female medley swimmers
European Aquatics Championships medalists in swimming
Soviet female rowers
World Rowing Championships medalists for the Soviet Union
Rowers from Saint Petersburg